Lim Hyun-Woo (born 26 March 1983) is a South Korean football midfielder. who plays for Royal Thai Navy.

External links 

1983 births
Living people
Association football midfielders
South Korean footballers
Daegu FC players
K League 1 players
Expatriate footballers in Thailand